Bertol is a surname.

Notable people
Notable people with this surname include:
 Daniela Bertol, Italian architect
 Paula María Bertol (born 1965), Argentinian legislator
 Roberto Bertol (1917–1990), Spanish footballer

See also
 Bertoli
 Bertolini
 Bertolo
 Bertoloni